Yahsat 1A is a communications satellite constructed by EADS Astrium and Thales Alenia Space for Al Yah Satellite Communications Company (Yahsat). It was launched in April 2011 from Arianespace's Guiana Space Centre in Kourou French Guiana in a dual payload launch with Intelsat New Dawn atop an Ariane 5 ECA rocket. Yahsat Y1A is based on the Eurostar E3000 satellite bus and had a launch mass of about 6000 kg. It is intended to provide Ku, Ka and C-band communications to the Middle East, Africa, Europe and Southwest Asia. It is in geosynchronous orbit at 52.5 degrees East.

References

Spacecraft launched in 2011
Communications satellites in geostationary orbit
Ariane commercial payloads
Satellites using the Eurostar bus
SES satellites